Juan Gimeno Guillamón (20 May 1913 in Barcelona – 5 May 1998 in Barcelona) was a Spanish professional road cyclist. He finished 3rd overall in the 1945 Vuelta a España and won the 4th stage. He was also the Spanish national road race champion the same year.

Major results

1934
 6th Overall Volta a Catalunya
1936
 3rd Overall Volta a Catalunya
1939
 1st Stage 13 Tour du Maroc
1940
 1st Overall Vuelta a Mallorca
 1st Stage 4 Vuelta a Cantabria
 1st Stage 7 Circuito del Norte
 2nd Trofeo Masferrer
 5th Overall Volta a Catalunya
1941
 1st Stage 5a Circuito del Norte
1942
 1st Overall Gran Premio Vittoria
1st Stages 2, 4 & 5
 4th Overall Vuelta a España
1943
 1st Stage 3 Gran Premio Vittoria
 4th Overall Volta a Catalunya
1944
 6th Overall Vuelta a la Comunidad Valenciana
 10th Overall Volta a Catalunya
1945
 1st  Road race, National Road Championships
 2nd Overall Volta a Catalunya
1st Stage 9
 3rd Overall Vuelta a España
1st Stage 4
1946
 9th Trofeo Masferrer
1947
 3rd Overall Vuelta a la Comunidad Valenciana
1948
 3rd Overall Vuelta a la Comunidad Valenciana

References

1913 births
1998 deaths
Spanish male cyclists
Volta a Catalunya cyclists
Cyclists from Catalonia
20th-century Spanish people